List of Governors of Punjab may refer to: 

 List of governors of Punjab (British India), the pre-independence province of Punjab
 List of governors of Punjab (India) governors of Punjab state of India
 Governor of Punjab, Pakistan, governors of the Punjab province of Pakistan